Cumrew is a small village and civil parish in north-east Cumbria, England. The population of the civil parish taken at the 2001 census was 85, increasing to 131 at the 2011 Census.

Village
Cumrew consists of two townships one of which is Cumrew Inside and the other Cumrew outside. Together they contain 2,686 acres. The parish borders Croglin, Cumwhitton, Carlatton, and Castle Carrock.
The village consists of 33 households 31 of which have permanent living residents. Business in Cumrew is very limited and consisted of farms and an company called Cleanroom Supplies Ltd. The local farms include Rising Sun, Helme and Gateshaw Mill.

History

In Hutchinson's time the outline of an extensive quadrangle was visible in a field near the church, suggesting that a large object had occupied the spot it may be seen that an outline of an extensive quadrangle used to exist, possibly the remains of Dunwalloght Castle. There is not much supporting evidence for this claim or assumption, as when two small mounds were removed in 1832 there was no trace of a foundation. The Dacres family formerly owned two small estates in the area, which they sold to Sir Christopher Musgrave and Dugdale, in his Baronage, suggesting that they had a castle on this site, near the borders. Beyond this allusion nothing is known, either of Dunwalloght's history or its site.

On the summit of Cardunnock, whose British name has descended to us with considerable purity with ancient Keltic inhabitants. Near is a cairn of stones. An accumulation of these stones must have cost the expenditure of a vast amount of labour. Is where some British chief was laid to rest, with his war axe and flint headed spear beside him.  "Great indeed must have been the importance of the mighty dead, for whom these sepulchres on the mountains' brow were reared ; and as when living they were held in honour, so they were set forth on their long journey to the unseen land of Annwyn – the Celtic Paradise of the west – it may be with a nation's tribute of reverence and love."

St Mary's Church

The Church is dedicated to St Mary, built in 1890 on a medieval site, and was designed by George Dale Oliver. The church is very small with a small tower to the west of the church which holds two bells. The church became a grade two listed building on 1 April 1957.

Population

The population of Cumrew has been decreasing for a number of years between been 1831 to 1891. The population slightly increased in 1901 then took another turn and decreased again between 1921 and 1951. There are two major factors that could have influenced this population decline. The first is that of World War I 1914 to 1918 where young men were called up that would have worked on the farm land around the parish. Britain had casualties totalling 2,535,424, so many of the men that were called up to fight for King and country did not return, leading to a population decrease in many English rural parishes. It was not long for people who had returned from the war were to be called up again in 1939 because of the start of World War II and like before many of the men did not return from the war thus left the rural populations of the parishes to decline once more. Britain sent more than 5 million men to fight in the war, consequently having a negative impact on the rural parishes. from Since 1961 the population of the village has stayed in an upward trend.

Occupational structure of Cumrew in 1831

Information on the occupational structure of Cumrew is limited. The bar chart shows that many of the men living in the parish in 1831 were agricultural labourers working on farms, for example Rising Sun, Helme Farm and Cateshaw Mill, in and round Cumrew. The farms also supplied many of the boarding parishes with employment as 12 of the farmers employed agricultural labourers.

Governance
Carlatton and Cumrew is a joint parish council for Cumrew and neighbouring Carlatton; it forms part of the City of Carlisle non-metropolitan district. Cumrew is situated in the electoral ward of Wetheral on the City of Carlisle non-metropolitan district council. Which elects two councillors. Currently both seats are held by the conservatives, cllr Barry Ogilvie Earp and cllr Neville John Lishman. Cumrew is also situated in the Wetheral Division which elects one councillor to Cumbria County Council currently held by the conservatives, Nicholas Henry Marriner. The village of Cumrew is located inside Penrith and The Border constituency for elections to the UK Parliament. This seat is also currently held by the conservatives.

See also

Listed buildings in Cumrew

References

External links
Cumbria County History Trust: Cumrew (nb: provisional research only – see Talk page)

Villages in Cumbria
City of Carlisle
Civil parishes in Cumbria